James Edward Campos (born October 19, 1972) is an American businessman who served in the Trump administration as the Director of the Office of Economic Impact and Diversity at the United States Department of Energy (DOE) between 2018 and 2021. Campos was nominated to the position on March 2, 2018 by President Donald Trump and confirmed 98-2 by the United States Senate on April 9, 2018.

Education
Campos has earned a B.A. and an M.S. from the University of Maryland and an M.B.A. from the University of Glasgow. During his master's program, Campos also matriculated at Corpus Christi College, Oxford, where he studied business and literature and spent a year in Barcelona, Spain where he studied cultural studies.

Campos is currently enrolled in Stanford University's professional studies certificate program in Energy Innovation & Emerging Technologies. Campos holds an executive business program certificate from Georgetown University’s McDonough School of Business and is certified as an Inspector/Investigator by the National Council on Licensure, Enforcement and Regulation. Campos is also a trained conflict resolution mediator with the Clark County, Nevada Neighborhood Justice Center. Campos also holds a graduate certificate in Diversity & Inclusion from Cornell University.

Early Political Career
In 2002, Campos was the Coalitions Director for Nevada Republican Attorney General nominee Brian Sandoval's campaign.

In 2004, Campos worked on the campaign to re-elect George W Bush as president.

In 2005, Campos was the state director of the Young Hispanic Republican Association.

In 2006, Campos worked as the Minority Coalitions Outreach Coordinator on Nevada Republican gubernatorial nominee Jim Gibbons campaign. After the General Election, Campos would go on to serve as Director of Governor Gibbons office in Las Vegas.

In February 2007, Campos was appointed as the statewide Commissioner of the Nevada Consumer Affairs Division (NCAD), the state government entity that regulates deceptive trade practices in the marketplace. During Campos tenure, the NCAD developed the first state-based fraud fighting website in the country: www.fightfraud.nv.gov. The website informed consumers about recent fraudulent activities and scams. In 2007, Campos founded and chaired the Nevada FightFraud Task Force.  The task force is composed of local, state and Federal law enforcement agencies and was the first of its kind in the state of Nevada.

In 2008, Campos was the Nevada Hispanic Chair for Republican presidential nominee John McCain’s campaign.

In March 2009, the duties of the NCAD were absorbed by the Nevada Attorney General's Office. Subsequently, Campos was named Deputy Administrator of Workforce Solutions in the Nevada Department of Employment, Training & Rehabilitation.

In 2012, Campos was named as a member of Republican presidential nominee Mitt Romney’s National Hispanic Steering Committee.

From March 2015 to April 2018, Campos served as a State Regulator on the Nevada Taxicab Commission.

Campos has held several additional state-wide gubernatorial appointments in Nevada, including: 
 Nevada’s Equal Rights Commission (April 2011 to 2015);
 Nevada’s Judicial Selection Commission (temporary member) (July 2011);
 Governor’s Workforce Investment Sector Council on Gaming, Tourism & Entertainment (Jan. 2014);
 Governor’s Workforce Investment Sector Councils on Mining and Minerals (Feb. 2014); and
 Governor’s Office of Economic Development’s International Trade Council (May 2014 to October 2017).

Director of the Office of Economic Impact and Diversity
As Director, Campos oversaw the Office of Economic Impact and Diversity and the Office of Civil Rights and Diversity. Campos served as the DOE’s Chief Diversity Officer and as the official Federal designee to the White House Interagency Working Group Initiative, which included the White House Initiative on Asian Americans and Pacific Islanders, the White House Initiative on Educational Excellence for Hispanics and the White House Initiative to Promote Excellence and Innovation at Historically Black Colleges and Universities.

Campos also served as the DOE’s Equal Employment Opportunity Director and was the Department’s designee on the White House Opportunity and Revitalization Council. Campos also served on The White House Council on Affordable Housing.

In 2018, Campos established the "Equity in Energy" initiative, to "expand the participation of individuals in under-served communities, which includes minorities, Native Americans, women, veterans, and formerly incarcerated persons, in all the programs of the Department." The program has external and internal engagement components. Externally, the DOE conducted listening sessions with underrepresented groups, to gain insights and ideas as to how the DOE can increase minority representation in the energy sector. Internally, the DOE worked with the Department's program offices and the National Laboratories to bring awareness to these issues and address potential solutions.

Career Outside Politics
Campos previously served as the Senior Adviser on Economic Development and Government Relations to President Bart Patterson of Nevada State College. From July 2009 to October 2011, Campos was the Director of Renewable Energy Initiatives and Government Relations for the College of Southern Nevada.

Campos has taught as an adjunct college professor, teaching courses in organizational operations, international management, marketing, strategy, public relations and human resources

Campos is also a very successful entrepreneur having started a successful strategic business and political consulting firm in addition to owning and operating the oldest and most prominent Mexican restaurant in Historic Downtown Las Vegas.

Awards
In 2006, Campos received the "Professional Service Award" from the Las Vegas Latin Chamber of Commerce. In 2010, he received the group's "Young Professional of the Year" award.  In 2011, Campos was recognized in the Las Vegas “In Business Magazine’s” top five most influential Hispanics in business. Campos was also named as one of the "Most Influential Hispanics in Nevada" by Nevada Hispanic Magazine in 2015, 2016, and 2018.

Personal life
Campos was born on October 19, 1972, the son of Joseph Campos and Christina Campos. Campos has three siblings: sisters Laurie and Vickie and brother Joe. Campos’ mother and father were born and raised in Omaha, NE, and the former is the daughter of Ysabel Anaya, eldest child of Calixto and Cuca de Loa of Omaha's flagship Mexican family, the de Loa family.

Campos father served in the United States Navy during the Korean War, followed by fifteen additional years in the United States Navy Reserve. After the completion of his military service, the elder Campos would go on to serve as a Federal employee, where he was stationed in eight Latin American countries over a sixteen-year period. Campos grandparents were Mexican and immigrated to the United States in the early 1900s.

Campos is engaged to Irma Aguirre.

See also

 Lists of Americans

References

Living people
1972 births
University System of Maryland alumni
Alumni of the University of Glasgow
American politicians of Mexican descent
Nevada politicians
Nevada Republicans
Politicians from Las Vegas
21st-century American politicians
Trump administration personnel
United States Department of Energy officials